Stuyvesant High School (pronounced ), commonly referred to among its students as Stuy (pronounced ), is a public  college-preparatory, specialized high school in New York City, United States. Operated by the New York City Department of Education, these specialized schools offer tuition-free accelerated academics to city residents.

Stuyvesant was established as an all-boys school in the East Village of Manhattan in 1904. An entrance examination was mandated for all applicants starting in 1934, and the school started accepting female students in 1969. Stuyvesant moved to its current location at Battery Park City in 1992 because the student body had become too large to be suitably accommodated in the original campus. The old building now houses several high schools.

Admission to Stuyvesant involves passing the Specialized High Schools Admissions Test. Every March, the 800 to 850 applicants with the highest SHSAT scores out of the around 30,000 students who apply to Stuyvesant are accepted. The school has a wide range of extracurricular activities, including a theater competition called SING! and two student publications.

Stuyvesant consistently ranks among the top schools in the nation. Based on a Niche report, Stuyvesant High School ranks as the #1 public high school in New York State and ranks sixth nationally among public high schools in the United States. Notable alumni include former United States Attorney General Eric Holder, physicists Brian Greene and Lisa Randall, economist Thomas Sowell, mathematician Paul Cohen, chemist Roald Hoffmann, genome researcher Eric Lander, Angel Investor Naval Ravikant, and comedian Billy Eichner. Stuyvesant is one of only six secondary schools worldwide that has educated four or more Nobel laureates.

History

Planning 
New York City's Superintendent of Schools, William Henry Maxwell, had first written about the need to construct manual trade schools in New York City in 1887. At the time, C. B. J. Snyder was designing many of the city's public school buildings using multiple architectural styles. The first trade school in the city was Manual Training High School in Brooklyn, which opened in 1893. By 1899, Maxwell was advocating for a manual trade school in Manhattan.

In January 1903, Maxwell and Snyder submitted a report to the New York City Board of Education in which they suggested the creation of a trade school in Manhattan. The Board of Education approved the plans in April 1904. They suggested that the school occupy a plot on East 15th Street, west of First Avenue. However, that plot did not yet contain a school building, and so the new trade school was initially housed within PS 47's former building at 225 East 23rd Street. The Board of Education also wrote that the new trade school would be "designated as the Stuyvesant High School, as being reminiscent of the locality." Stuyvesant Square, Stuyvesant Street, and later Stuyvesant Town (which was built in 1947) are all located near the proposed 15th Street school building. All of these locations were named after Peter Stuyvesant, the last Dutch governor of New Netherland and owner of the area's Stuyvesant Farm. The appellation was selected in order to avoid confusion with Brooklyn's Manual Training High School.

Opening and boys' school 
Stuyvesant High School opened in September 1904 as Manhattan's first manual trade school for boys. At the time of its opening, the school consisted of 155 students and 12 teachers.

At first, the school provided a core curriculum of "English, Latin, modern languages, history, mathematics, physics, chemistry, [and] music," as well as a physical education program and a more specialized track of "woodworking, metalworking, mechanical drawing, [and] freehand drawing." However, in June 1908, Maxwell announced that the trade school curriculum would be separated from the core curriculum and a discrete trade school would operate in the Stuyvesant building during the evening. Thereafter, Stuyvesant became renowned for excellence in math and science. In 1909, eighty percent of the school's alumni went to college, compared to other schools, which only sent 25% to 50% of their graduates to college.

By 1919, officials started restricting admission based on scholastic achievement. Stuyvesant implemented a double session plan in 1919 to accommodate the rising number of students: some students would attend in the morning, while others would take classes in the afternoon and early evening. All students studied a full set of courses. These double sessions ran until Spring 1957. The school implemented a system of entrance examinations in 1934. The examination program, developed with the assistance of Columbia University, was expanded in 1938 to include the newly founded Bronx High School of Science.

In 1956, a team of six students designed and began construction of a cyclotron. A low-power test of the device succeeded six years later. A later attempt at full-power operation, however, knocked out the power to the school and surrounding buildings.

Co-educational school 
In 1967, Alice de Rivera filed a lawsuit against the Board of Education, alleging that she had been banned from taking Stuyvesant's entrance exam because of her gender. The lawsuit was decided in the student's favor, and Stuyvesant was required to accept female students. The first female students were accepted in September 1969, when Stuyvesant offered admission to 14 girls and enrolled 12 of them. The next year, 223 female students were accepted to Stuyvesant. By 2015, females represented 43% of the total student body.

In 1972, the New York State Legislature passed the Hecht–Calandra Act, which designated Brooklyn Technical High School, Bronx High School of Science, Stuyvesant High School, and the High School of Music & Art (now Fiorello H. LaGuardia High School) as specialized high schools of New York City. The act called for a uniform exam to be administered for admission to Brooklyn Tech, Bronx Science, and Stuyvesant. The exam, named the Specialized High Schools Admissions Test (SHSAT), tested the mathematical and verbal abilities of students who were applying to any of the specialized high schools. The only exception was for applicants to LaGuardia High School, who were accepted by audition rather than examination.

September 11 attacks 
The school was evacuated during the attack. Although the smoke cloud coming from the World Trade Center engulfed the building at one point, there was no structural damage to the building, and there were no reports of physical injuries. Less than an hour after the collapse of the second World Trade Center tower, concern over a bomb threat at the school prompted an evacuation of the surrounding area, as reported live on the Today show. When classes resumed on September 21, 2001, students were moved to Brooklyn Technical High School while the Stuyvesant building served as a base of operations for rescue and recovery workers. This caused serious congestion at Brooklyn Tech, and required the students to attend in two shifts, with the Stuyvesant students attending the evening shift. Normal classes resumed nearly a month after the attack, on October 9.

Because Stuyvesant was so close to the World Trade Center site, there were concerns of asbestos exposure. The U.S. EPA indicated at that time that Stuyvesant was safe from asbestos, and conducted a thorough cleaning of the Stuyvesant building. However, the Stuyvesant High School Parents' Association contested the accuracy of the assessment. Some problems, including former teacher Mark Bodenheimer's respiratory problems, have been reported—he accepted a transfer to The Bronx High School of Science after having difficulty continuing his work at Stuyvesant. Other isolated cases include Stuyvesant's 2002 class president Amit Friedlander, who received local press coverage in September 2006 after being diagnosed with cancer. While there have been other cases linked to the same dust cloud that emanated from Ground Zero, there is no definitive evidence that such cases have directly affected the Stuyvesant community. Stuyvesant students did spend a full year in the building before the theater and air systems were cleaned, however, and a group of Stuyvesant alumni has been lobbying for health benefits since 2006 as a result. In 2019, during a hearing on the reauthorization of the 9/11 Victims Compensation Fund, alumnus Lila Nordstrom testified before the House Judiciary Committee about the conditions at Stuyvesant on and after 9/11.

Nine alumni were killed in the World Trade Center attack. Another alumnus, Richard Ben-Veniste of the class of 1960, was on the 9/11 Commission. On October 2, 2001, the school newspaper, The Spectator, created a special 24-page full-color 9/11 insert containing student photos, reflections and stories. On November 20, 2001, the magazine was distributed for free to the greater metropolitan area, enclosed within 830,000 copies of The New York Times. In the months after the attacks, Annie Thoms, an English teacher at Stuyvesant and the theater adviser at the time, suggested that the students take accounts of staff and students' reactions during and after September 11, 2001, and turn them into a series of monologues. Thoms then published these monologues as With Their Eyes: September 11—The View from a High School at Ground Zero.

Later history 
During the 2003–2004 school year, Stuyvesant celebrated the 100th anniversary of its founding with a full year of activities. Events included a procession from the 15th Street building to the Chambers Street one, a meeting of the National Consortium for Specialized Secondary Schools of Mathematics, Science and Technology, an all-class reunion, and visits and speeches from notable alumni.

In the 21st century, keynote graduation speakers have included Attorney General Eric Holder (2001), former President Bill Clinton (2002), United Nations Secretary General Kofi Annan (2004), Late Night comedian Conan O'Brien (2006), Humans of New York founder Brandon Stanton (2015), actor George Takei (2016), and astrophysicist Neil deGrasse Tyson (2018).

Buildings

15th Street building

In August 1904, the Board of Education authorized Snyder to design a new facility for Stuyvesant High School at 15th Street. The new school would be shaped like the letter "H" in order to maximize the number of windows on the building. The cornerstone for the new building was laid in September 1905. Approximately $1.5 million was spent on constructing the school, including $600,000 for the exterior alone. In 1907, Stuyvesant moved to the new building on 15th Street. The new building had a capacity of 2,600 students, more than double that of the existing school building at 23rd Street. It contained 25 classrooms devoted to skilled industrial trades such as joinery, as well as 53 regular classrooms and a 1,600-seat auditorium.

During the 1950s, the building underwent a $2 million renovation to update its classrooms, shops, libraries, and cafeterias.

Through the 1970s and 1980s, when New York City public schools, in general, were marked by violence and low grades among their students, Stuyvesant had a reputation for being a top-notch school. However, the school building was deteriorating due to overuse and lack of maintenance. A New York Times report stated that the building had "held out into old age with minimal maintenance and benign neglect until its peeling paint, creaking floorboards and antiquated laboratories became an embarrassment." The five-story building could not cater adequately to the several thousand students, leading the New York City Board of Education to make plans to move the school to a new building in Battery Park City, near lower Manhattan's Financial District. The 15th Street building remains in use as the "Old Stuyvesant Campus," housing three schools: the Institute for Collaborative Education, the High School for Health Professions and Human Services, and PS 226.

Current building
In 1987, New York City Mayor Ed Koch and New York State Governor Mario Cuomo jointly announced the construction of a new Stuyvesant High School building in Battery Park City. The Battery Park City Authority donated  of land for the new building. The authority was not required to hire the lowest bidder, which meant that the construction process could be accelerated in return for a higher cost. The building was designed by the architectural firms of Gruzen Samton Steinglass and Cooper, Robertson & Partners. The structure's main architect, Alexander Cooper of Cooper, Robertson & Partners, had also designed much of Battery Park City.

Stuyvesant's principal at the time, Abraham Baumel, visited the country's most advanced laboratories to gather ideas about what to include in the new Stuyvesant building's 12 laboratory rooms. The new 10-story building also included banks of escalators, glass-walled studios on the roof, and a four-story northern wing with a swimming pool, five gymnasiums, and an auditorium. Construction began in 1989. When it opened in 1992, the building was New York City's first new high school building in ten years. The new Stuyvesant Campus cost $150 million, making it the most expensive high school building ever built in the city at the time. The library has a capacity of 40,000 volumes and overlooks Battery Park City.

Shortly after the building was completed, the $10-million Tribeca Bridge was built to allow students to enter the building without having to cross the busy West Street. The building was designed to be fully compliant with the Americans with Disabilities Act and is listed as such by the New York City Department of Education. As a result, the building is one of the 5 additional sites of P721M, a school for students with multiple disabilities who are between the ages of 15 and 21.

In 1997, the eastern end of the mathematics floor was dedicated to Richard Rothenberg, the math department chairman who had died from a sudden heart attack earlier that year. Sculptor Madeleine Segall-Marx was commissioned to create the Rothenberg Memorial in his honor. She created a mathematics wall entitled "Celebration", consisting of 50 wooden boxes—one for each year of his life—behind a glass wall, featuring mathematical concepts and reflections on Rothenberg.

In 2006, Robert Ira Lewy of the class of 1960 made a gift worth $1 million to found the Dr. Robert Ira Lewy M.D. Multimedia Center. and donated his personal library in 2007. In late 2010, the school library merged with the New York Public Library (NYPL) network in a four-year pilot program, in which all students of the school received a student library card so they could check books out of the school library or any other public library in the NYPL system.

An escalator collapse at Stuyvesant High School on September 13, 2018 injured 10 people, including 8 students.

Mnemonics

During construction, the Battery Park City Authority, the Percent for Art Program of the City of New York, the Department of Cultural Affairs, and the New York City Board of Education commissioned Mnemonics, an artwork by public artists Kristin Jones and Andrew Ginzel. Four hundred hollow glass blocks were dispersed randomly from the basement to the tenth floor of the new Stuyvesant High School building. Each block contains relics providing evidence of geographical, natural, cultural, and social worlds, from antiquity to the present time.

The blocks are set into the hallway walls and scattered throughout the building. Each block is inscribed with a brief description of its contents or context. The items displayed include a section of the Great Wall of China, fragments of the Mayan pyramids, leaves from the sacred Bo tree, water from the Nile and Ganges Rivers, a Revolutionary War button, pieces of the 15th Street Stuyvesant building, a report card of a student who studied in the old building, and fragments of monuments from around the world, various chemical compounds, and memorabilia from each of the 88 years' history of the 15th Street building. Empty blocks were also installed to be filled with items chosen by each of the graduating classes up through 2080. The installation received the Award for Excellence in Design from the Art Commission of the City of New York.

Transportation
Additionally, New York City Bus's  and  routes stop near Stuyvesant. Students residing a certain distance from the school are provided full-fare or half-fare student MetroCards for public transportation at the start of each term, based on how far away the student resides from the school.

Enrollment

Entrance examination
Stuyvesant has a total enrollment of over 3,000 students and is open to residents of New York City entering ninth or tenth grade. Enrollment is based solely on performance on the three-hour Specialized High Schools Admissions Test, which is administered annually. Approximately 28,000 students took the test in 2017. The list of schools using the SHSAT has since grown to include eight of New York's nine specialized high schools. The test score necessary for admission to Stuyvesant has consistently been higher than that needed for admission to the other schools using the test. Admission is currently based on an individual's score on the examination and the pre-submitted ranking of Stuyvesant among the other specialized schools. Ninth- and rising tenth–grade students are also eligible to take the test for enrollment, but far fewer students are admitted that way. The test covers math (word problems and computation) and verbal (reading comprehension) skills. Former Mayor John Lindsay and community activist group Association of Community Organizations for Reform Now (ACORN) have argued that the exam may be biased against African and Hispanic Americans, while attempts to eliminate the exam have been criticized as discriminatory against Asian Americans.

Demographics and SHSAT controversy
For most of the 20th century, the student body at Stuyvesant was heavily Jewish. A significant influx of Asian students began in the 1970s; by 2019, 74% of the students in attendance were Asian-American (53% from families with low incomes). In the 2013 academic year, the student body was 72.43% Asian, 21.44% Caucasian, 1.03% African American, 2.34% Hispanic, and 3% unknown/other. The paucity of Black and Hispanic students at Stuyvesant has often been an issue for some city administrators. In 1971, Mayor John Lindsay argued that the test was culturally biased against black and Hispanic students and sought to implement an affirmative action program. However, protests by parents forced the plan to be scrapped and led to the passage of the Hecht-Calandra Act, which preserved admissions by examination only. A small number of students judged to be economically disadvantaged and who came within a few points of the cut-off score were given an extra chance to pass the test.

Community activist group ACORN published two reports in 1996, titled Secret Apartheid and Secret Apartheid II. In these reports, ACORN called the SHSAT "permanently suspect" and described it as a "product of an institutional racism," saying that black and Hispanic students did not have access to proper test preparation materials. Along with Schools Chancellor Rudy Crew, they began an initiative for more diversity in the city's gifted and specialized schools, in particular demanding the SHSAT be suspended altogether until the Board of Education was able to show all children have had access to appropriate materials to prepare themselves. Students published several editorials in response to ACORN's claims, stating the admissions system at the school was based on student merit, not race.

A number of students take preparatory courses offered by private companies such as The Princeton Review and Kaplan in order to perform better on the SHSAT, often leaving those unable to afford such classes at a disadvantage. To bridge this gap and boost minority admissions, the Board of Education started the Math Science Institute in 1995, a free program to prepare students for the admissions test. Students attend preparatory classes through the program, now known as the Specialized High School Institute (also known as DREAM), at several schools around the city from the summer after sixth grade until the eighth-grade exam. Despite the implementation of these free programs for improving underprivileged children's enrollment, black and Hispanic enrollment continued to decline. After further expansion of those free test prep programs, there was still no increase in percentages to the attendance of black and Hispanic children. , fewer than 1% of freshman openings were given to black students, while over 66% were given to Asian-American students, most of whom were from similar socioeconomic backgrounds.

The New York City Department of Education reported in 2003 that public per student spending at Stuyvesant is slightly lower than the city average. Stuyvesant also receives private contributions.

Academics
The college-preparatory curriculum at Stuyvesant mostly includes four years of English, history, and laboratory-based sciences. The sciences courses include requisite biology, chemistry, and physics classes. Students also take four years of mathematics. Students also take three years of a single foreign language; a semester each of introductory art, music, health, and technical drawing; one semester of computer science; and two lab-based technology courses. Several exemptions from technology education exist for seniors. Stuyvesant offers students a broad selection of elective courses. Some of the more notable offerings include astronomy, New York City history, Women's Voices, and the mathematics of financial markets. Most students complete the New York City Regents courses by junior year and take calculus during their senior year. However, the school offers math courses through differential equations for the more advanced students. A year of technical drawing was formerly required; students learned how to draft by hand in its first semester and how to draft using a computer in the second. Now, students take a one-semester compacted version of the former drafting course, as well as a semester of introductory computer science. For the class of 2015, the one-semester computer science course was replaced with a two-semester course.

As a specialized high school, Stuyvesant offers a wide range of Advanced Placement (AP) courses. These courses focus on math, science, history, English, or foreign languages. This gives students various opportunities to earn college credit. AP computer science students can also take three additional computer programming courses after the completion of the AP course: systems level programming, computer graphics, and software development. In addition, there is a one-year computer networking class which can earn students Cisco Certified Network Associate (CCNA) certification.

Stuyvesant's foreign language offerings include Mandarin Chinese, French, German, Japanese, Latin, and Spanish. In 2005, the school also started offering courses in Arabic after the school's Muslim Student Association had raised funds to support the course. Stuyvesant's biology and geo-science department offers courses in molecular biology, human physiology, medical ethics, medical and veterinary diagnosis, human disease, anthropology and sociobiology, vertebrate zoology, laboratory techniques, medical human genetics, botany, the molecular basis of cancer, nutrition science, and psychology. The chemistry and physics departments include classes in organic chemistry, physical chemistry, astronomy, engineering mechanics, and electronics.

Although Stuyvesant is primarily known for its math and science focus, the school also has a comprehensive humanities program. The English Department offers students courses in British and classical literature, Shakespearean literature, science fiction, philosophy, existentialism, debate, acting, journalism, creative writing, and poetry. The Social Studies core requires two years of global history (or one year of global followed by one year of European history), one year of American history, as well as a semester each of economics and government. Humanities electives include American foreign policy; civil and criminal law, prejudice and persecution, and race, ethnicity and gender issues.

In 2004, Stuyvesant entered into an agreement with City College of New York in which the college funds advanced after-school courses that are taken for college credit but taught by Stuyvesant teachers. Some of these courses include physical chemistry, linear algebra, advanced Euclidean geometry, and women's history.

Prior to the 2005 revision of the SAT, Stuyvesant graduates had an average score of 1408 out of 1600 (685 in the verbal section of the test, 723 in the math section). In 2010, the average score on the SAT for Stuyvesant students was 2087 out of 2400, while the class of 2013 had an average SAT score of 2096. , Stuyvesant students' average SAT score was 1490 of 1600 points. Stuyvesant also administers more Advanced Placement exams than any other high school in the world, as well as the highest number of students who reach the AP courses' "mastery level". , there are 31 AP classes offered, with a little more than half of all students taking at least one AP class, and about 98% of students pass their AP tests.

Extracurricular activities

Sports
Stuyvesant fields 32 varsity teams, including the swimming, golf, bowling, volleyball, soccer, basketball, gymnastics, wrestling, fencing, baseball/softball, American handball, tennis, track/cross country, cricket, football, and lacrosse teams. In addition, Stuyvesant has ultimate teams for the boys' varsity, boys' junior varsity, and girls' varsity divisions.

In September 2007, the Stuyvesant football team was given a home field at Pier 40, located north of the school at Houston Street and West Street. In 2008, the baseball team was granted use of the pier after construction and delivery of an artificial turf pitching mound that met Public Schools Athletic League specifications. Stuyvesant also has its own swimming pool, but it does not contain its own running track or tennis court. Unlike most American high schools, most sports teams at Stuyvesant are individually known by different names. Only the football, cheerleading, girls' table tennis, baseball, girls' handball, and boys' lacrosse teams retain the traditional Pegleg monikers.

Student government
The student body of Stuyvesant is represented by the Stuyvesant Student Union, a student government. It comprises a group of students (elected each year for each grade) who serve the student body in two important areas: improving student life by promoting and managing extracurricular activities (clubs and publications),  by organizing out-of-school activity such as city excursions or fundraisers; and providing a voice to the student body in all discussion of school policy with the administration.

Clubs and publications
Stuyvesant allows students to join clubs, publications, and teams under a system similar to that of many colleges. , the school had 150 student clubs.

The Spectator

The Spectator is Stuyvesant's official in-school newspaper, which is published biweekly and is independent from the school. There are over 250 students who help with publication. At the beginning of the fall and spring terms, there are recruitments, but interested students may join at any time.

Founded in 1915, The Spectator is one of Stuyvesant's oldest publications. It has a long-standing connection with its older namesake, Columbia University's Columbia Daily Spectator, and has been recognized by the Columbia University Graduate School of Journalism's Columbia Scholastic Press Association.

The Voice

The Voice was founded in the 1973–1974 academic year as an independent publication only loosely sanctioned by school officials. It had the appearance of a magazine and gained a large readership. The Voice attracted a considerable amount of controversy and a First Amendment lawsuit, after which the administration forced it to go off-campus and to turn commercial in 1975–1976.

At the beginning of the 1975–1976 academic year, The Voice decided to publish the results of a confidential random survey measuring the "sexual attitudes, preferences, knowledge and experience" of the students. The administration refused to permit The Voice to distribute the questionnaire, and the Board of Education refused to intervene, believing that "irreparable psychological damage" would be occasioned on some of the students receiving it. The editor-in-chief of The Voice, Jeff Trachtman, brought a First Amendment challenge to this decision in the United States District Court for the Southern District of New York in front of Judge Constance Baker Motley.

Motley, relying on the relatively recent Supreme Court precedent Tinker v. Des Moines Independent Community School District (holding that "undifferentiated fear or apprehension of disturbance is not enough to overcome the right to freedom of expression"), ordered the Board of Education to come up with an arrangement permitting the distribution of the survey to the juniors and seniors. However, Motley's ruling was overturned on appeal to the United States Court of Appeals for the Second Circuit. Judge J. Edward Lumbard, joined by Judge Murray Gurfein and over an impassioned dissent by Judge Walter R. Mansfield, held that the distribution of the questionnaires was properly disallowed by the administration since there was the basis for the belief that it might "result in significant emotional harm to a number of students throughout the Stuyvesant population." The Supreme Court denied certiorari review.

SING!

The annual theater competition known as SING! pits seniors, juniors, and "soph-frosh" (freshmen and sophomores working together) against each other in a contest to put on the best performance. SING! started in 1947 at Midwood High School in Brooklyn and has expanded to many New York City high schools since then. SING! at Stuyvesant started as a small event in 1973, and since then, has grown to a school-wide event; in 2005, nearly 1,000 students participated. The entire production is written, directed, produced, and funded by students. Their involvement ranges from being members of the production's casts, choruses, or costume and tech crews to Step, Hip-Hop, Swing, Modern, Belly, Flow, Tap or Latin dance groups. SING! begins in late January to February and culminates in final performances on three nights in March/April. Scoring is done on each night's performances and the winner is determined by the overall total. In 2023, soph-frosh won SING! for the first time in the tradition's fifty-one year history.

Reputation
Stuyvesant has produced many notable alumni, including four Nobel laureates. In 2017, Stuyvesant was ranked 71st in national rankings by U.S. News & World Report, and 21st among STEM high schools. According to a September 2002 high school ranking by Worth magazine, 3.67% of Stuyvesant students went on to attend Harvard, Yale, and Princeton universities, ranking it as the 9th top public high school in the United States and 120th among all schools, public or private. In December 2007, The Wall Street Journal studied the freshman classes at eight selective colleges and reported that Stuyvesant sent 67 students to these schools, comprising 9.9% of its 674 seniors. In recent years, the Stuyvesant Spectator has reported on college admissions of the graduating classes, with Class of 2021 having 133 students offered admission to Ivy League institutions.

Stuyvesant, along with other similar schools, has regularly been excluded from Newsweek'''s annual list of the Top 100 Public High Schools. The May 8, 2008, issue states the reason as being, "because so many of their students score well above average on the SAT and ACT." U.S. News & World Report, however, included Stuyvesant on its list of "Best High Schools" published in December 2009, ranking 31st. In its 2010 progress report, the New York City Department of Education assigned it an "A", the highest possible grade.

Stuyvesant has contributed to the education of several Nobel laureates, winner of the Fields Medal, and other accomplished alumni. In recent years, it has had the second highest number of National Merit Scholarship semi-finalists, behind Thomas Jefferson High School for Science and Technology in Alexandria, Virginia. From 2002 to 2010, Stuyvesant has produced 103 semi-finalists and 13 finalists on the Intel Science Talent Search, the second most of any secondary school in the United States behind the Bronx High School of Science. In 2014, Stuyvesant had 11 semifinalists for the Intel Search, the highest number of any school in the U.S.

In the 2010s, exam schools, including Stuyvesant, have been the subject of studies questioning their academic effectiveness. A study by Massachusetts Institute of Technology and Duke University economists compared high school outcomes for Stuyvesant students who barely passed the SHSAT score required for admission, to those of applicants just below that score, using the latter as a natural control group of peers who attended other schools. The study found no discernible average difference in the two groups' later performance on New York state exams.

Notable people

Notable scientists among Stuyvesant alumni include mathematicians Bertram Kostant (1945) and   
Paul Cohen (1950), string theorist Brian Greene (1980), physicist Lisa Randall (1980), and genomic researcher Eric Lander (1974). Other prominent alumni include civil rights leader Bob Moses, MAD Magazine editor Nick Meglin (1953), entertainers such as songwriter and Steely Dan founder Walter Becker, Thelonious Monk (1935), and actors Lucy Liu (1986), Tim Robbins (1976), and James Cagney (1918), comedian Paul Reiser (1973), playwright Arthur M. Jolly (1987), sports anchor Mike Greenberg (1985), and basketball player and bookmaker Jack Molinas (1949). In business, government and politics, former United States Attorney General Eric Holder (1969) is a Stuyvesant alumnus, as are Senior Advisor to President Obama David Axelrod (1972), former adviser to President Clinton Dick Morris (1964), and founder of 5W Public Relations Ronn Torossian (1992).

Pulitzer Prize-winning author Frank McCourt taught English at Stuyvesant before the publication of his memoirs Angela's Ashes, 'Tis, and Teacher Man. Teacher Man third section, titled Coming Alive in Room 205, concerns McCourt's time at Stuyvesant, and mentions a number of students and faculty. Former New York City Council member Eva Moskowitz (1982) graduated from the school, as did the creator of the BitTorrent protocol, Bram Cohen (1993). A notable Olympic medalist from the school was foil fencer Albert Axelrod. Economist Thomas Sowell was also a student of Stuyvesant High School, but dropped out at age 17 because of financial difficulties and problems in his home. Russian journalist Vladimir Pozner Jr., known in the West for his appearances on Nightline, U.S.–Soviet Space Bridge and Phil Donahue, was also a student of Stuyvesant High School.

Four Nobel laureates are Stuyvesant alumni:
 Joshua Lederberg (1941) – Nobel Prize in Physiology or Medicine, 1958
 Robert Fogel (1944) – Nobel Memorial Prize in Economic Sciences, 1993
 Roald Hoffmann (1954) – Nobel Prize in Chemistry, 1981
 Richard Axel (1963) – Nobel Prize in Physiology or Medicine, 2004

 In the media 

In the film The Glass Wall'', the character Freddie Zakoyla attended "Peter Stuyvesant High School."

See also

 Education in New York City
 Health effects arising from the September 11 attacks
 List of New York City Designated Landmarks in Manhattan from 14th to 59th Streets

References

Further reading

External links

 
 
 Stuyvesant High School's Official Newspaper—The Spectator
 The Campaign for Stuyvesant Endowment Fund

 
Educational institutions established in 1904
Gifted education
Public high schools in Manhattan
NCSSS schools
Specialized high schools in New York City
Stuyvesant
Battery Park City
1904 establishments in New York City
New Classical architecture